Jewish law and custom prescribe ritual hand washing in a number of situations. This practice is generally known by the Hebrew term , which literally means taking up of the hands.

Occasions for hand washing

Before eating bread
Halakha requires the hands to be washed before eating a meal containing bread. This washing was initially known as mayim rishonim (first waters) but is now commonly known simply as netilat yadayim (hand washing).

This only applies to bread made from one of the five chief grains (wheat, cultivated barley, spelt, wild barley, and oats). The washing is performed by pouring water from a cup over each hand.

The Gemarah of the Babylonian Talmud contains homiletic descriptions of the importance of the practice, including an argument that washing before meals is so important that neglecting it is tantamount to unchastity, and risks divine punishment in the form of sudden destruction or poverty.

Rabbinic law requires that travelers go as far as four biblical miles to obtain water for washing prior to eating bread if there is a known water source there. This applies only to when the water source lies in one's direction of travel. However, had he already passed the water source, he is only obligated to backtrack to a distance of one biblical mile. The one exception to this rule is when a man or a party of men are encamped while on a journey, and there is no water to be found in the vicinity of their camp, in which case the Sages of Israel have exempted them from washing their hands prior to breaking bread.

After eating bread (Mayim Acharonim)

Rabbinic sources discuss a practice to wash hands after a meal, before reciting Birkat Hamazon. This practice is known as mayim acharonim ("after-waters"). According to the Talmud, the washing is motivated by health concerns, to remove the "salt of Sodom" which may have been served at the meal - as salt originating from the Sodom area allegedly causes blindness, should it be on one's fingers and they happen to touch their eyes. The Talmud considered mayim acharonim obligatory, and more important that washing before the meal. Many, but not all, later sources agree.

However, Tosafot ruled that mayim acharonim is not required in current circumstances, since the salt of Sodom is no longer served at meals. Similarly, R' Yaakov Emden ruled that it is not required, since nowadays it is customary to eat with forks and knives, and salt is unlikely to get on the fingers. Based on these sources, in many communities nowadays mayim acharonim is not practiced. Nevertheless, many others continue to practice it. One reason to continue practicing it is the principle that if the underlying reason behind a rabbinic ruling no longer applies, the ruling is not automatically cancelled. Another reason has given the assertion that in every kor of salt, there is to be found a qurtov of salt of Sodom.

Although mayim acharonim was once not widely practiced (for example, until recently it did not appear in many Orthodox Passover Haggadahs) it has undergone something of a revival and has become more widely observed in recent years, particularly for special meals such as the Shabbat and Jewish holidays.

No blessing is recited on this washing. Generally, only a small amount of water is poured over the outer two segments of the fingers, while a minority (primarily Yemenite Jews or related groups) wash the entire hand up to the wrist.  The water is sometimes poured from  a special ritual dispenser. One should not pause between the washing and reciting birkat hamazon.

Thematic interpretations
Rabbi Abraham Isaac Kook explained that our involvement in the physical act of eating has the potential to diminish our sense of holiness. To counteract this influence, we wash our hands after the meal. The Talmudic Sages spoke of washing away the "salt of Sodom" – a place whose very name is a symbol of selfishness and indifference to others. "This dangerous salt, which can blind our eyes to the needs of others, is rendered harmless through the purifying ritual of mayim acharonim."

Before eating dipped fruit or vegetables
Some sources speak of washing hands, before eating a piece of food which has been dipped in a liquid (e.g. water, honey, oil, etc.) which then clings to that piece, with the one exception of fruits, seeing that they do not require hand washing. While the Shulhan Arukh requires the washing of hands prior to eating fruits that are merely damp with one of the seven liquids, Maimonides does not mention this stringency in his Mishneh Torah. Rabbi Hayim Kessar says that the enactment only applied to dipping fruits or vegetables in a liquid, but not when wetness merely clung to those fruits or vegetables.

Nowadays this washing is not widely practiced, with one notable exception: During a Passover Seder, the hands are washed without reciting a blessing before eating karpas, a washing referred to as "Urchatz".

Before worship 

According to the Shulchan Aruch, a person should wash both hands before prayer. This hand washing does not require the use of a cup (or similar vessel), though many have the custom to use a cup. No blessing is recited on this washing. If water cannot be obtained, the hands may be cleaned in another manner instead.

As the Shacharit prayer is commonly recited shortly after awakening, many Jews rely on the handwashing upon awakening, and do not wash hands again before Shacharit.

This washing is likened to the ritual purification required before entering the Temple in Jerusalem, in whose absence prayer, in Orthodox Judaism, serves in its place.

Before the Priestly Blessing 

In Orthodox Judaism (and, in some cases, in Conservative Judaism), Kohanim, members of the priestly class, offer the Priestly Blessing before the congregation on certain occasions. Before performing their offices, they are required to wash their hands. The verse also refers to washing of feet, but this is generally not practiced in the absence of a Temple in Jerusalem.

The water for this washing is commonly poured on the priests' hands by Levites, who also assist priests in other ways.

In some communities priests do not wash their hands before the Priestly Blessing, the reasoning being that they have already washed hands upon awakening before the prayer.

After sleeping 

According to the Shulchan Aruch, a person who slept is required to wash upon arising, and says the netilat yadayim blessing. This ritual is known by the Yiddish term  (lit. "nail water"), and sometimes in Hebrew as Netilat Yadayim Shacharit. This Yiddish term is also used for a special cup used for such washing. The water is poured out from a vessel three times, intermittently, over each hand.

Reasons given for this washing vary: to remove an evil spirit from one's fingers, or in preparation for the morning prayer, or to make the hands physically clean before reciting blessings and studying Torah. This is performed when awaking from a full night's sleep, or even after a lengthy nap.

The Talmud states God commanded Jews to wash the hands and provides the text of the netilat yadaim blessing still in use.

Other occasions
 After touching part of the body which is dirty or customarily covered such as the private parts, back, arm pits, inside of nose or ear, the scalp (but not if one just touched the hair), or the sweat from one's body (excluding the face), or one's shoes
 Upon leaving a latrine, lavatory or bathhouse, as a symbol of both bodily cleanliness and of removing human impurity. Handwashing after excretion is sometimes referred to as "washing asher yatzar", referring to the Asher yatzar blessing recited once the hands have been washed after excretion.
 Upon leaving a cemetery
 After cutting one's hair or nails
 The Shulchan Aruch specifies that one must wash hands after sexual intercourse, but among many Orthodox Jews this is not accepted practice.
 After a blood letting; while blood letting is no longer performed, some wash their hands after donating blood.
 To remove tumat met ("impurity from death") after participating in a funeral procession or coming within four cubits of a corpse
 Some have the custom of washing their hands prior to scribal work

Laws of washing

Halakha (Jewish law) requires that the water used for ritual washing be naturally pure, unused, not contain other substances, and not be discoloured.

Blessing said before washing 
A blessing is prescribed over hand washing before eating bread and when one wakes up from his sleep in the morning. Maimonides prescribes saying the blessing before one actually pours water over his hands, as brought down by the Code of Jewish Law, and the Talmud  requiring that for all of the commandments the recitation of the blessing must be made prior to one performing the action. But for some, the custom has developed to recite the blessing only after he has poured water over his hands and has rubbed them together, while they are raised in the air to the height of his chin, prior to his drying them with a towel.

The blessing text is as follows: "Blessed are you, O Lord, our God, King of the Universe, who has sanctified us through your commandments and has commanded us concerning the washing of hands". Immediately following the recital of the blessing, one must dry the hands with a towel or similar.

Manner of pouring the water

In two of these hand washings, water is poured out over one's hands with the aid of a vessel: 1) upon waking from sleep, and 2) before eating bread. These hand washings are nearly always accompanied with a special blessing prior to concluding the actual act of washing (see infra). The basis of references in the Bible to this practice, e. g., Elisha pouring water upon the hands of Elijah. Water should be poured on each hand at least twice. A clean dry substance should be used instead if water is unavailable. The hand washing made when one leaves the lavatory or latrine, or when one touches his privy parts, or sweat, may be done simply with running tap water (faucet).

Other methods have developed concerning over which hand one is to begin when pouring water over them. The general custom in the morning (based on a kabbalistic teaching) is to take-up the vessel in one's right hand, pass the vessel into his left hand, and only then begin to pour out water from that vessel over his right hand. Then one reverses the order by taking-up the vessel in his right hand and pouring out water from that vessel over his left hand. This process is repeated altogether three times for each hand, with intermittent changing of hands after each pouring. When this is accomplished, he then takes the vessel and pours out water over both hands, simultaneously, after which he rubs his hands together and then lifts them to make the blessing over his hands, before he wipes them dry.

In the hand washing made for eating bread, the custom differs: one takes the vessel in his right hand and pours water in abundance over his left hand. He then takes the vessel in his left hand and pours water in abundance over his right hand. In this case (for eating bread), it is not necessary to wash the hands three times, intermittently, as is customarily done in the morning. Rather, one or two pours for each hand are sufficient.

Quantity of water
Although the minimal quantity of water needed to fulfill one's religious duty is 1/4 of a log (a liquid measure of capacity equal to the bulk or volume of one and half medium-sized eggs), and must be sufficient to cover at least the middle joints of one's fingers, water poured out in excess of this amount is considered praiseworthy in Jewish law.

Development of hand washing on bread 

The most developed and, perhaps, important of these washings is the washing of hands before eating bread. It is looked upon with such rigidity, that those who willfully neglect its practice are said to make themselves liable to excommunication, and bring upon themselves a state of scarcity, and are quickly taken out of the world.

Hand washing in the Temple
 requires the priests to wash their hands and feet before offering sacrifices or entering the Tabernacle. In addition, the Mishnah records that priests were required to wash hands and feet after urinating. The use of these lavers did not pertain to the general public, nor to their eating foods with washed hands.

The Mishnah (Tractate Yadayim) is the first to describe the ritual of hand washing outside of the Temple.

According to the Babylonian Talmud, King Solomon made an additional decree that priests must wash their hands before eating meat from animal sacrifices.

Hand washing for priests before eating terumah 
Following the example of King Solomon, in the 1st or 2nd century CE, the Houses of Hillel and Shammai decreed the priests' hands to be ritually impure, which disqualified their eating terumah foods until washing those hands (as terumah may only be eaten while pure). This law was one of the eighteen new enactments made in the house of Hananiah ben Hezekiah ben Garon. It is recorded in Mishnah Bikkurim 2:1, which states that terumah and bikkurim "require the washing of the hands."

The Babylonian Talmud debates whether this decree was enacted by the Houses of Hillel and Shammai, or else by Hillel and Shammai themselves (in the year circa 32 BCE). It concludes that Hillel and Shammai issued the decree but this was not commonly accepted; and later, the Houses of Hillel and Shammai reissued the degree and it was accepted.

The Jerusalem Talmud states that Hillel and Shammai did not originate washing before eating terumah, but rather the requirement had existed in ancient times, and then was neglected and forgotten until Hillel and Shammai revived it.

This enactment was made in order to instruct priests about the necessity of washing their hands after immersing their bodies in a mikveh, since the Torah requires priests to eat their consecrated foods in a state of ritual purity. Bodily purity can only be attained by, both, immersing themselves in a ritual bath as well as by washing their hands before consuming of such foods.

Grades of uncleanness 
Halacha specifies a number of different levels of impurity; each level can result from touch by an object at one higher level. By this degree, all human hands automatically have second-level impurity (sheni letumah) until washed. If (after washing) a person's hands touched a first-level impurity (rishon letumah), those hands become impure as far as the "pereq" (wrist), while the rest of his body remains pure. All that is needed, therefore, is for him to wash his hands in water, and he removes thereby all uncleanness.

Hand washing for all Israelites 
In subsequent years, many priests were ignoring the requirement to wash hands before touching terumah. To encourage the performance of this law, it was decreed that all Jews (priests and non-priests) must wash their hands before eating bread, even if that bread to be eaten was only ordinary non-terumah bread. According to the Babylonian Talmud, the underlying motive for this new enactment was because hands were considered "fidgety," and apt to touch things. "Hence, unless their owner has taken care that they should not touch a ritually unclean object after he washed them, they are treated as unclean."  capable of rendering terumah invalid for consumption. This hand washing is referred to as serakh terumah ( meaning "[washing introduced] on account of terumah" and which is done for the sake of conformity);<ref>Babylonian Talmud, [https://www.sefaria.org.il/Chullin.106a.11?lang=bi&with=all&lang2=en Chullin 106a:11 Hullin 106a]</ref> as all Jews were now required to wash their hands before eating bread, it was expected that the delinquent priests too would wash their hands before eating 'terumah.

The Jerusalem Talmud, speaking more candidly about this subject, says explicitly: "Did they not decree [defilement] over the hands in order that he (i.e. the priest) might separate himself from the terumah? By saying to a man that his hands suffer a second-grade uncleanness, even so does he (the priest) separate himself from terumah." Unwashed hands which suffer a second-grade uncleanness were capable of invalidating terumah given to the priests.

Others have explained hand washing as being merely for the sake of bodily cleanliness which, in turn, leads to ritual purity. Rabbi Hiyya the Great had commanded Rav (Abba Aricha) by saying: "If you are able to eat all throughout the year non-consecrated foods in a state of ritual purity, then eat! But if not, at least eat seven days out of the year [in such a state of ritual purity]." On account of these words, Rabbi Pinchas ben Yair would say: "...Bodily cleanliness leads to ritual purity."

External sources 
It is unclear what sort of regulations were already in place during the late Second Temple period. A reference to hand washing is made in the Christian New Testament, when the Pharisees asked Jesus why his disciples did not wash hands prior to eating bread. It is reported that "the Pharisees and all the Jews" considered this washing a "tradition of the elders", yet Jesus and the disciples did not do it - even though one proclaimed to be the Messiah might be expected to follow the highest standards for holy behavior. Thus, the disciples' non-observance may indicate that handwashing for bread was not universal at the time. Perhaps, handwashing was practiced by some Pharisaic schools of thought and not others (for example, by the School of Shammai and not the more lenient School of Hillel).

References

External links 

 The Laws Upon Awakening in the Morning (Chabad)
 Hand Washing, by Rabbi Louis Jacobs
 A Short History of Jewish Handwashing

Hand
Hygiene
Jewish belief and doctrine
Jewish law
Jewish law and rituals
Jewish ritual purity law
Water and religion
Priesthood (Judaism)